"My Little Girl" is a song co-written and recorded by American country music singer Tim McGraw that reached the top three on the Billboard Hot Country Songs chart. It was released in August 2006 as the second single from his compilation album Tim McGraw Reflected: Greatest Hits Vol. 2. The song was also featured on the 2006 film, Flicka. It was nominated by the Broadcast Film Critics Association for Best Song in 2006. McGraw co-wrote the song with Tom Douglas, making it the first single of McGraw's career that he had a hand in writing.

Content
The narrator of the song addresses his daughter, telling her that even though she is growing up, she will always be "[his] little girl".

Critical reception
Kevin John Coyne, reviewing the song for Country Universe, gave it a negative rating. He said that the song is "so sugary-sweet it can cause cavities." He then says that compared to his last single, "When The Stars Go Blue", this song is a letdown.

Music video
The video shows many scenes from the movie, Flicka, while McGraw is shown singing the song with his band in front of an orchestra. It was directed by Sherman Halsey. It was released in late September, 2006.

Chart performance
"My Little Girl" debuted at number 51 on the U.S. Billboard Hot Country Songs for the week of August 12, 2006.

Year-end charts

Certifications

References

2006 singles
2006 songs
Tim McGraw songs
Songs written by Tim McGraw
Songs written by Tom Douglas (songwriter)
Song recordings produced by Byron Gallimore
Song recordings produced by Tim McGraw
Curb Records singles
Music videos directed by Sherman Halsey
Country ballads